Nihat Nikerel (05 February 1950 – 26 September 2009) was a Turkish actor, best known for his role in the crime drama series Kurtlar Vadisi.

Selected filmography
 Tarzan of Manisa (1994)

References

External links

1950 births
2009 deaths
Turkish male film actors
Turkish male stage actors
Turkish male television actors